María Luisa Zea (5 February 1913 – 27 December 2002) was a Mexican actress and singer of the Golden Age of Mexican cinema. In her career spanning 24 years, she appeared in over 50 motion pictures.

Selected filmography
La Llorona (1933)
Sanctuary (1933)
La noche del pecado (1933)
Juarez and Maximillian (1934)
La Zandunga (1938)
Una luz en mi camino (1939)
Cuando habla el corazón (1943)
My Lupe and My Horse (1944)
El corsario negro (1944)
El jagüey de las ruinas (1944)
El Gran campeón (1949)
Yo maté a Juan Charrasqueado (1949)
They Say I'm a Communist (1951)

External links

1913 births
2002 deaths
Mexican film actresses
20th-century Mexican actresses
Actresses from Mexico City
Singers from Mexico City
20th-century Mexican women singers